The Waikiki BeachBoys were a minor league baseball team in the Hawaii Winter Baseball league. They were based in Honolulu, Hawaii.  The BeachBoys name derives from the "Beach Boys of Waikiki," a group credited with the rebirth of surfing in Hawaii.

The BeachBoys played their home games at the Les Murakami Baseball Stadium.

Notable players
 Yonder Alonso
 Jeremy Bleich
 Lucas Duda
 Todd Frazier
 Buster Posey

Team record

References

Sports in Honolulu
Defunct Hawaii Winter Baseball teams
2006 establishments in Hawaii
Baseball teams established in 2006
2008 disestablishments in Hawaii
Baseball teams disestablished in 2008
Defunct baseball teams in Hawaii